Richard Paul "Jumbo" Lapointe (August 2, 1955 – October 17, 1999) was a Canadian professional ice hockey defenceman who played eleven seasons in the National Hockey League (NHL) for the Detroit Red Wings, Philadelphia Flyers, St. Louis Blues, Quebec Nordiques and Los Angeles Kings.

LaPointe married his high school sweetheart Rhonda and had three children. He died in 1999 of a heart attack. In his honour, there is an annual Bantam Triple-A Showcase tournament in Victoria, British Columbia.

Career statistics

Regular season and playoffs

International

Awards
 WCHL All-Star Team – 1975

References

External links
 

1955 births
1999 deaths
Canadian ice hockey defencemen
Detroit Red Wings draft picks
Detroit Red Wings players
Fredericton Express players
Ice hockey people from British Columbia
Kansas City Blues players
Los Angeles Kings players
Nanaimo Clippers players
National Hockey League first-round draft picks
Philadelphia Flyers players
Quebec Nordiques players
Sportspeople from Victoria, British Columbia
St. Louis Blues players
Toronto Toros draft picks
Victoria Cougars (WHL) players
Victoria Cougars (WHL) coaches
Canadian ice hockey coaches